Pride is an American documentary television miniseries revolving around LGBT rights in the United States decade-by-decade. It consists of 6 episodes and premiered on May 14, 2021, on FX.

Synopsis
The series follows LGBT rights in the United States decade-by-decade beginning with the 1950s. Episode 1 features the story of LGBT rights activist, lawyer and memoirist Madeleine Tress.

It features appearances by Christine Jorgensen, Flawless Sabrina, Ceyenne Doroshow, Susan Stryker, Kate Bornstein, Dean Spade, Raquel Willis, Christine Vachon, Margaret Cho, John Waters, Jewelle Gomez, Ann Northrop, Zackary Drucker, Jules Gill-Peterson, CeCe McDonald, Brontez Purnell, B. Ruby Rich, Chase Strangio, Michael Musto and Tez Anderson, among other writers and LGBT historians.

Episodes

Production
In August 2019, it was announced FX had ordered a documentary series about LGBT rights in the United States with Killer Films, Vice Studios and Refinery29 set to produce. In March 2021, it was announced Tom Kalin, Andrew Ahn, Cheryl Dunye, Anthony Caronna, Alex Smith and Ro Haber would serve as directors on the series, with Refinery29 no longer attached. Production began in April 2021 in Greenwich Village, Lower Manhattan, the site of the June 1969 Stonewall Riots, considered widely to be the catalyst for the gay rights movement.

Reception
Pride has been receiving favorable critical acclaim. On review aggregator Rotten Tomatoes, the series has an approval rating of 100% based on 12 reviews, with an average rating of 7.5/10.  On Metacritic, the series has a weighted average score of 72 out of 100 based on reviews from 9 critics, indicating "generally favorable reviews".

Accolades

References

External links
  (link available within US only)
 

2021 American television series debuts
2021 American television series endings
2020s American television miniseries
2020s American documentary television series
English-language television shows
Television series based on actual events
FX Networks original programming
2020s American LGBT-related television series
Transgender-related television shows